Pivahn-hon-kya-pi, also known as Pi Va Hon Kia Pi, is a populated place situated in Navajo County, Arizona, United States.

References

Populated places in Navajo County, Arizona